Piu or PIU may refer to:

People with the name
 Alessandro Piu (born 1996), Italian footballer
 Francesco Piu (born 1981), Italian composer
 Mario Più (born 1965), Italian DJ
 Piu (Brazilian footballer) (born 1976), Fabrício Nogueira Nascimento

Other uses 
 Più, a tempo qualifier in music
 Piu language, of Papua New Guinea
 Pump It Up (video game series)
 PIU, IATA code for Cap. FAP Guillermo Concha Iberico International Airport
 Principles of Intelligent Urbanism

See also 
 Pius (disambiguation)